The Syndicalist Confederation of Intercultural Communities of Bolivia (CSCIB) is a peasant union of rural communities in the lowlands of Bolivia whose members included people of highland origin. It is led by Pedro Calderón and includes federations in six departments: La Paz, Cochabamba, Santa Cruz, Tarija, Chuquisaca, and Beni. It was founded on February 18, 1971 as the Syndicalist Confederation of Colonizers of Bolivia. At the time, its independence from the government represented a defiant break from the so-called Military-Peasant Pact.

The Confederation is a founding member of the National Coordination for Change (CONALCAM). Its leader from 2007 to 2010, Fidel Surco, became president of CONALCAM as well as a Senator in the Plurinational Legislative Assembly.

Leadership
In its most recent Ordinary National Conference, held in August 2010 in Ivirgarzama, Cochabamba, CSCIB elected the following leaders:
 Executive Secretary: Pedro Calderón, from Carrasco, Tropics of Cochabamba
 Secretary General: Néstor Aliaga, from Caranavi, La Paz
 International Relations: Evaristo Huallpa, from San Julián, Santa Cruz

Prior leaders include Fidel Surco (2007-August 2010) from Alto Beni, La Paz.

References

Trade unions in Bolivia
National federations of trade unions
1971 establishments in Bolivia
Trade unions established in 1971
Syndicalist trade unions